OIMB may refer to:

Oregon Institute of Marine Biology, University of Oregon, Charleston, Oregon, U.S.
 ICAO airport code for Birjand International Airport in Iran